Guillermo Rodrigo Teodoro Ortiz Mondragón (March 13, 1947 – September 14, 2021) was a Mexican Roman Catholic prelate. He served as the Bishop of the Roman Catholic Diocese of Cuautitlán from October 2005 until his death in September 2021. 

Ortiz was born on March 13, 1947, in Toluca, State of Mexico. He was ordained a deacon on December 15, 1974, and a Catholic priest on June 6, 1976. Ortiz was appointed an auxiliary bishop of the Roman Catholic Archdiocese of Mexico in January 2000.

In November 2000, Ortiz was elected President of the Episcopal Conference of Mexico. He also served as the official spokesperson for Pope John Paul II's fifth visit to Mexico in July and August 2002.

Ortiz was appointed Bishop of the Roman Catholic Diocese of Cuautitlán by Pope Benedict XVI on October 19, 2005. He was ordained on November 23, 2005, and held the position until his death in September 2021.

Bishop Guillermo Ortiz Mondragón died on September 14, 2021, at the age of 74.

References

1947 births
2021 deaths
People from Toluca
Mexican Roman Catholic bishops
Bishops appointed by Pope Benedict XVI